The first series of The Great British Sewing Bee started on 2 April and aired for four episodes concluding on 23 April 2013. The series was hosted by Claudia Winkleman and the judges were May Martin and Patrick Grant of Savile Row.

Sewers

Results and eliminations
Colour key

 Sewer got through to the next round
 Sewer was eliminated
 Sewer won Garment of the week
 Sewer was the series runner-up
 Sewer was the series winner
 Sewer withdrew

Episodes
 Sewer eliminated   Best Garment  Winner

Episode 1

Episode 2

Episode 3: Semifinal

Episode 4: Final

Episode 5: Christmas Special
Semi-finalists Lauren, Sandra, Stuart, and winner Ann return for a Christmas special. Holiday projects include a table runner, embroidered Christmas napkins, and a Christmas stocking.

Ratings
All ratings are taken from BARB.

References

2013 British television seasons
The Great British Sewing Bee